Himley Cricket Club is an amateur cricket club in Himley, South Staffordshire, which is near Dudley. Founded in 1883 their 1st XI is currently in the Birmingham and District Premier League Premier division, and their 2nd XI in the first division. They run 3 further sides on Saturdays,  2 in the worcestershire county league and 1 in the staffordshire club cricket championship.
The club reached the national village ko final at lords in 1988.
They play their home games at Stourbridge Road, Himley.

References

External links
HimleyCC official website

English club cricket teams
1883 establishments in England